Lara Wolters is a Dutch politician of the Labour Party who has been serving as a Member of the European Parliament since 2019.

Early life and education
After studying law and European social and political studies (ESPS) at the University College London she spent a year at the University of Strasbourg through the Erasmus Programme, where she completed an internship at the European Parliament.

Political career
Wolters became a Member of the European Parliament when she replaced Frans Timmermans who decided not to take his parliamentary seat following the 2019 European elections. She has since been serving on the Committee on Budgetary Control and on the Committee on Legal Affairs. In this capacity, she is the co-rapporteur on a 2022 directive on improving the gender balance on boards of directors of listed companies.

In addition to her committee assignments, Wolters is part of the Parliament's delegation for relations with China. She is also a member of the European Parliament Intergroup on Anti-Corruption, the European Parliament Intergroup on Anti-Racism and Diversity, and the Responsible Business Conduct Working Group.

References

External links
 Her MEP profile

Living people
1986 births
Labour Party (Netherlands) MEPs
MEPs for the Netherlands 2019–2024
21st-century women MEPs for the Netherlands
Alumni of University College London
Alumni of the Erasmus Programme